The Levi H. Gale House is a historic house at 85 Touro Street in Newport, Rhode Island, United States.

Russell Warren designed the house, which was built in 1835 for attorney Levi Gale. In 1925-26 the building was moved from its original location on Washington Square because of the erection of the Courthouse. The Jewish congregation of nearby Touro Synagogue paid to move the building and preserve it for use as a Jewish Community Center.  The house is now located at the corner of Touro and Division Street. The Levi Gale House was added to the National Register of Historic Places in 1971 and continues to be used as a Jewish community center.

See also

National Register of Historic Places listings in Newport County, Rhode Island.

References

External links

Houses completed in 1835
Houses on the National Register of Historic Places in Rhode Island
Russell Warren buildings
Houses in Newport, Rhode Island
Jewish Community Centers in the United States
Jews and Judaism in Rhode Island
Historic American Buildings Survey in Rhode Island
Sephardi Jewish culture in the United States
National Register of Historic Places in Newport, Rhode Island
Historic district contributing properties in Rhode Island